In statistics, a Tsallis distribution is a probability distribution derived from the maximization of the Tsallis entropy under appropriate constraints.  There are several different families of Tsallis distributions, yet different sources may reference an individual family as "the Tsallis distribution". The q-Gaussian is a generalization of the Gaussian in the same way that Tsallis entropy is a generalization of standard Boltzmann–Gibbs entropy or Shannon entropy. Similarly, if the domain of the variable is constrained to be positive in the maximum entropy procedure, the q-exponential distribution is derived.

The Tsallis distributions have been applied to problems in the fields of statistical mechanics, geology, anatomy, astronomy, economics, finance, and machine learning. The distributions are often used for their heavy tails.

Note that Tsallis distributions are obtained as Box–Cox transformation over usual distributions, with deformation parameter . This deformation transforms exponentials into q-exponentials.

Procedure
In a similar procedure to how the normal distribution can be derived using the standard Boltzmann–Gibbs entropy or Shannon entropy, the q-Gaussian can be derived from a maximization of the Tsallis entropy subject to the appropriate constraints.

Common Tsallis distributions

q-Gaussian
See q-Gaussian.

q-exponential distribution
See q-exponential distribution

q-Weibull distribution
See q-Weibull distribution

See also 

 Constantino Tsallis
 Tsallis statistics
 Tsallis entropy

Notes

Further reading
Juniper, J. (2007) "The Tsallis Distribution and Generalised Entropy: Prospects for Future Research into Decision-Making under Uncertainty", Centre of Full Employment and Equity, The University of Newcastle, Australia
Shigeru Furuichi, Flavia-Corina Mitroi-Symeonidis, Eleutherius Symeonidis, On some properties of Tsallis hypoentropies and hypodivergences, Entropy, 16(10) (2014), 5377-5399; 
Shigeru Furuichi, Flavia-Corina Mitroi, Mathematical inequalities for some divergences, Physica A 391 (2012), pp. 388-400, ; 
Shigeru Furuichi, Nicușor Minculete, Flavia-Corina Mitroi, Some inequalities on generalized entropies, J. Inequal. Appl., 2012, 2012:226.

External links 
 Tsallis Statistics, Statistical Mechanics for Non-extensive Systems and Long-Range Interactions

Statistical mechanics
Types of probability distributions
Probability distributions with non-finite variance